Kilcoy is a rural town and locality in the Somerset Region, Queensland, Australia.

Geography

The topography directly north of the town is dominated by the mountains of the Conondale Range and covered by forests, some of which are protected in state forests and the Conondale National Park. Kilcoy is located in the Somerset Region.

Climate
The Somerset region experiences a humid subtropical climate (Köppen climate classification Cfa) with hot and humid summers and mild to warm winters with cool overnight temperatures.

Records of rainfall for the year of the 2010–11 Queensland floods in South East Queensland and for the period February 2010 to January 2011 are incomplete.

History

Aboriginal history
The Aboriginal people of the Brisbane River Valley and Kilcoy region are the Jinibara People, traditionally a nation of five clans: the Dungidau centred in the Kilcoy region and the junction of the Stanley and Brisbane Rivers; the Dala or Dallumbara clan inhabiting the Conondale Range west to the Brisbane River; the Gurumngar around the southern end of the D’Aguilar Range; the Nalbo along the Maleny-Mapleton escarpment and the Dungibara on the Upper Brisbane River.

Duungidjawu (also known as Kabi Kabi, Cabbee, Carbi, Gabi Gabi) is an Australian Aboriginal language spoken on Duungidjawu country. The Duungidjawu language region includes the landscape within the local government boundaries of Somerset Region and Moreton Bay Region, particularly the towns of Caboolture, Kilcoy, Woodford and Moore.

Kilcoy was the heartland of the Jinibara People and the name comes from a patch of lawyer cane (jini) on Mount Kilcoy; 'bara' means' people' or 'folk'; thus Jinibara are the 'People of the Lawyer cane'. Kilcoy was known as Bumgur, meaning the 'blue cod'.

The Kilcoy region is a rich Aboriginal cultural landscape.  Mount Archer was known as Buruja, and also the name of a wetland near Villeneuve that was one of the main camps of the Dungidau clan.  Bora rings existed at 'Wellcourt' on Somerset Dam and at Sandy Creek east of Kilcoy, Oaky Creek and Waraba Creek.

The junction of the Brisbane and Stanley Rivers was known as Gunundjin, meaning a 'hollow place', and a sacred place, called Gairnbee Rock, recalled a dreaming story of a girl who went swimming there and was turned by her father, a gundir (clever man) by magic into a rock to save her from a dangerous evil spirit. The Stanley River was also called Gairnbee, meaning the water gum. The Brisbane River was known as Mairwar or Mairrwarrh, meaning  'platypus' in Dungidau.

British colonisation

In 1841, brothers Evan and Colin Mackenzie, of Kilcoy Castle, Newtown Scotland, took up land west of Durundur (in the Stanley River valley) and began grazing sheep soon after land was opened to free settlement. They named it after their home town. They sold the property to Charles A. Atherton in 1849. Atherton in turn sold it to Captain Louis Hope and John Ramsay in 1854. The partnership broke up ten years later, and Hope became sole owner and built the Kilcoy Station homestead of bricks, made on the property, and red cedar. Station managers for Captain Hope were Bryant about 1860, Captain Talbot, 1864 and William Butler from 1871 until the sale, where he purchased the homestead block. Hopetoun Post Office opened on 1 December 1892 (a Kilcoy receiving office had been open from 1889) and was renamed Kilcoy in 1907.

Massacre of Aboriginal people

In 1842 on the outskirts of Kilcoy Station owned by MacKenzie, 30–60 aborigines of the Gubbi Gubbi tribe, two Djindubari and some men from the Dalla tribe died from eating flour that settlers had laced with strychnine or arsenic.  Contrary to some claims, there were not a number of widely publicised instances around this time of large teams (30-50+) of white shearers being killed with strychnine in their evening meal, always in the period between them finishing the year's work and receiving their pay. The claim is completely specious. There were,  however, many well documented instances of both mass poisonings and poisonings involving smaller numbers of Aboriginal Peoples Kilcoy, Whiteside, Wide Bay, the Clarence River, the Manning River, the Condamine, Maryborough (Qld), west of Mackay, the Hodgkinson Goldfields, Kowanyama, to name but a few. (Bottoms. Timothy, 2013. Conspiracy Of Silence. Allen and Unwin. Sydney. pp79-80.) In fact, in 1915, Dr Walter Roth,  the former Chief  Protector of Aborigines, was moved to write to a colleague, "As for arsenic (the) only experience the poor devils had of it was when mixed purposely with station flour.) (ibid. p 79)

Establishment of township
Towards the end of the 1800s, large properties and Government leases began to be divided up for closer settlement.  Blocks capable of supporting a family were eagerly sought after, fenced and cleared.  The main source of income for these settlers was dairying. In 1877,  were resumed from the Kilcoy pastoral run and offered for selection on 19 April 1877.
Timber milling operations were established as early as 1877, with Frank Nicholson building at Villeneuve, followed by James Green (1888), Hancock Brothers (1897), George Seeney and William and Stan Kropp in the same vicinity. The turn of the century saw a huge increase in activity as Hancock & Gore timber mill began operation.

The site of the 'Town of Kilcoy' was surveyed by W. E. Hill by April 1888, and the first land sale was on 6 November that year. The township quickly developed at the junction of Sheep Station and Kilcoy Creeks to service these settlers and their families. 

By the 1890s, the only original lease country left was in the Mt Kilcoy and Sandy Creek districts, part of Durundur Station.  This country was not opened for settlement until 1902.

Kilcoy's first Provisional School was opened in 1884 at Sheep Station Creek, some five to six miles north of Kilcoy Homestead, the name changing to Sheep Station Creek Provisional School in 1892 when the Kilcoy School opened its doors in Hope Street in Kilcoy. At that time there were still no subdivisions north of William Street as that was part of Kilcoy Station which was sold up in 1907.

A postal receiving office was established in 1889 .On 1 December 1892, the Hopetoun Post Office was opened at Kilcoy in rented premises in Royston Street. It was named after Louis Hope (the uncle of the first Governor General of Australia, Lord Hopetoun, who was a visitor to Kilcoy Station). The township was referred to unofficially as Hopetoun.

Kilcoy Township Provisional School opened on 15 August 1892. In 1893 it was renamed Kilcoy Provisional School. In1898 it was renamed Hopetoun Provisional School. In 1907 it became Hopetoun State School. In 1914 it was renamed  Kilcoy State School.

Brighton Hills Provisional School opened circa November 1904 and closed circa July 1918. It was described as "via Kilcoy".

20th century 

In 1908, the post office name was changed from Hopetoun to Kilcoy, to avoid incorrect mail distribution to other towns of the same name in Victoria and Western Australia.

In 1912, the Shire of Kilcoy was formed, and the area became independent from the Caboolture Shire.

The post office in Kennedy Street opened in 1913.
The establishment of the Kilcoy railway line in 1913 created a surge in the timber industry with more mills opening near Kilcoy (Bert Woodrow – c. 1916; Thurecht Brothers – c. 1918, George Payne – c. 1919) and at Louisavale (1912), Monsildale (1912) and Yednia (early 1900s).

The rural areas within a relatively small radius of Kilcoy township catering for the settlers laboring in the industries of dairy, cattle and timber were flourishing with cultural activity and those early years around the turn of the century witnessed small schools spring up in West Vale (1887–1910), Villeneuve (1902–1960), Hazeldean (Stanley River, 1898–1973), Gregors Creek (1896–1963), Woolmar (1894–1941), Louisavale (1915–1940), Monsildale (1913–1922 and 1941–1961), Jimna (1923–2006), Yednia (1911–1946), Sheep Station Creek (1884–1942), Somerset at upper Mount Kilcoy (1915–1943), Mount Kilcoy (1909) and Sandy Creek (Winya, 1918–1960).
Somerset Dam was constructed between 1935 and 1959 with suspension of construction during the Second World War. Construction of the Somerset Dam created many jobs.

In 1953, the Kilcoy Pastoral Company established an abattoir in the town.

The Jinibara people were granted Native Title by the Federal Court of Australia in 2012. The application used a series of tape recordings made in the 1950s of Aboriginal man, Gaiarbau, (also known as Willie MacKenzie) that provided detailed understandings of Aboriginal culture in southeast Queensland.  Gaiabau was born at Kilcoy in the 1870s and died  in a Salvation Army Home in Brisbane and was buried on 24 June 1968 in Mt Gravatt Cemetery.

In the 1960s, road transport ensured the demise of the railway line (1964) and the old Kilcoy railway yard was converted many years later into a park known as Yowie Park.

In January 1963, a secondary department was added to Kilcoy State School. On 1 January 1972 Kilcoy State High School opened, replacing the secondary department at Kilcoy State School. 

Deregulation of the dairy industry has caused a lot of these small farms to become unviable.

21st century 

The current Kilcoy library  opened in 2011.

A sand mining operation was proposed for the town in 2011, but the application was withdrawn on 31 October 2012 following strong opposition by the local residents.

Heritage listings 
Kilcoy has a number of heritage-listed sites, including Kilcoy Homestead on Kilcoy-Murgon Road.

Economy

Most of Kilcoy's residents are employed servicing the surrounding pastoral area. The town's industry mainly revolves around beef, with 1/3 of the primary school's population made of immigrants who came for work in the Kilcoy Pastoral centre.

Education 

Kilcoy State School is a government primary (Prep-6) school for boys and girls at 47 Royston Street. In 2018, the school had an enrolment of 304 students with 28 teachers (20 full-time equivalent) and 21 non-teaching staff (11 full-time equivalent).

Kilcoy State High School is a government secondary (7-12) school for boys and girls at Seib Street. In 2018, the school had an enrolment of 405 students with 39 teachers (36 full-time equivalent) and 25 non-teaching staff (18 full-time equivalent). It includes a special education program.

Amenities 
The Somerset Regional Council operates a public library at 15 Kennedy Street.

The Kilcoy branch of the Queensland Country Women's Association meets at the QCWA Hall at 33 Rose Street.

Kilcoy Wesleyan Methodist Church is at 30 McCauley Street. It is part of the Wesleyan Methodist Church of Australia.

There are three other Protestant churches in the town:  the Kilcoy United Pentecostal Church, the Kilcoy Uniting Church and the Kilcoy Seventh Day Adventist Church.

The local Stanley River Roman Catholic parish has a strong ecumenical focus. 

St Mary's Anglican Church is at 67 William Street.

Notable residents
 Merri Rose – politician (Labor Party)

See also

 Kilcoy District Historical Society

References

Further reading

External links

 Kilcoy Historical Society
 Kilcoy Tourism Body
 Somerset Regional Council

Massacres of ethnic groups
History of Indigenous Australians
Massacres in Australia
Suburbs of Somerset Region
Localities in Queensland